Global Air (Damojh Aerolíneas, S.A. de C.V.) was a Mexican airline. Founded in Guadalajara, Jalisco, in 1990, it worked in the field of air transportation and executive business travel. It is a non-regular commercial aviation company, registered in Mexico, which provides charter services, charter and wet lease. This charter airline specialized in leasing and aircraft as well as in air rescue.

In 2018, as a result of the Cubana de Aviación Flight 972 accident, its operating certificates were rescinded and it had to declare bankruptcy.

History 
Global Air began operations in February 1990 under the name of Damojh Aerolíneas S.A. de C.V., based in Guadalajara. Until December 2011 it was based at the Mexico City International Airport; it subsequently built new hangars and an apron at the Capitán Rogelio Castillo National Airport located in Celaya, Guanajuato.

On May 19, 2018, the Mexican government announced that its national civil aviation authority was to begin an operational audit of Global Air to see if the airline was in compliance with regulations, on May 21, 2018, the Mexican Directorate General of Civil Aviation temporarily revoked the company's airworthiness licence both following a fatal air accident in Cuba when one of their aircraft, a Boeing 737-200 Adv. wet-leased to Cubana de Aviación, crashed shortly after takeoff from Havana, killing 112 of the 113 people on board.

Destinations
The company operates national and international charter flights within Mexico and to the Caribbean, Central and South America.

Fleet

Before declaring bankruptcy, Global Air (Damojh Aerolíneas, S.A. de C.V.) operated two Boeing 737s:

1 Boeing 737-200, registration XA-UMQ.
1 Boeing 737-500, registration XA-UZK.

Accidents and incidents 
 On November 4, 2010, a Global Air Boeing 737-200, registration XA-UHY, had to make an emergency landing in the Mexican city of Puerto Vallarta due to a technical failure. That landing resulted in a suspension of activities for the airline between November and December of that year.
Another aircraft was suspended between October 2013 and January 2014 as a result of the demand made by Marco Aurelio Hernández, captain of the company, who denounced technical irregularities in the operation of the aircraft.
On May 18, 2018, a Global Air Boeing 737-200 Adv., registration XA-UHZ, operating on wet lease as Cubana de Aviación Flight 972, crashed shortly after takeoff from José Martí International Airport in Havana, Cuba. The crash killed 112 of the 113 people on board.

References

External links

Lo que sabemos de Aerolíneas Damojh (El Universal, May 19, 2018)

Airlines of Mexico City
Charter airlines of Mexico
Airlines established in 1990
1990 establishments in Mexico
Airlines disestablished in 2019
2019 disestablishments in Mexico
Defunct airlines of Mexico
Transportation in Guadalajara, Jalisco